Zelal may refer to:

Zelal, a 2010 documentary film
Zelal Baturay (born 1996), Turkish women's footballer
Zelal Cola, a cola brand soft drink produced and marketed in Germany